Vengo is a 2000 Spanish-French-German-Japanese film directed and written by Tony Gatlif. It is a musical drama about two Andalusia gypsy families locked in an age-old struggle for power. The film features a performance by Spanish flamenco singer Maria del Carmen Salazar ("La Caita").

Plot 
The story centres around a feud among Spanish Gypsies, with Caco (played by Antonio Canales) as the main character who must fight for his family's honor and safety.

Cast 
 Antonio Canales: Caco
 Orestes Villasan Rodriguez: Diego
 Antonio Dechent: Primo Alejandro
 Bobote: Habib
 Juan Luis Corrientes: Primo Tres

Reception 
Vengo was selected as closing film at the 57th Venice International Film Festival in 2000.

References

External links 

Spanish musical drama films
2000s Spanish-language films
2000 films
Films directed by Tony Gatlif
2000s Spanish films
French musical drama films
German musical drama films
Japanese musical drama films